Cheppudira Muthana Poonacha was the Chief Minister of Coorg, Minister in Mysore State, Member of Parliament (Rajya Sabha and Lok Sabha), Union Railway Minister of India and Governor of Madhya Pradesh and Governor of Orissa.

Freedom Movement
C. M. Poonacha was a descendant of the Coorg Dewans. During the Freedom Movement he was sentenced to imprisonment twice during the Salt Satyagraha in 1932 and 1933. He was again imprisoned in 1940–41 and in 1942–44. He became a member of All-India Congress Committee in 1938. Also, in 1938 he was elected to Coorg District Board, became its president in 1941 and in 1945 he was elected to Coorg Legislative Council. From 1945 to 1951 he was leader of the Congress Legislative Party in the council. He hence became a prominent member of the Indian National Congress party in Coorg.

Politics
In 1947 Coorg was a separate state in South India until 1956. The other states of South India at that time were Bombay Presidency, Madras Presidency, Mysore kingdom, Travancore kingdom, Cochin kingdom and Hyderabad kingdom. The Coorg State Assembly had a strength of 24 members and the Cabinet consisted of just two members.

Constituent Assembly Member (Constitution of India)
C M Poonacha represented the Coorg state as a member of the Constituent Assembly.

Chief Minister (Coorg)
Two parties fought the 1952 state elections: the Takkadi ('Scales of Justice') party under veteran Gandhian Pandyanda Belliappa, who was a dominant political force and voice of Coorg with its anti-merger plank, and the Congress under C.M. Poonacha in Coorg. Poonacha was elected Chief Minister of Coorg State (1952–56) in the first general elections. Coorg had two MPs in the Union Parliament then, besides having a state legislative body. In 1956 the State Reorganisation Act was passed. Coorg was merged with Mysore and the legislative body at Mercara dissolved. While the Chief Minister was C.M. Poonacha, (who also held the finance portfolio), the only other Minister was Home Minister, Kittur Mallappa. C.M. Poonacha had won the Beriathnad seat while K. Mallappa won the second seat from Sanivarasante. The Congress won 15 seats and Independents (opposing merger), represented by the Takkadi party, won nine seats. Under various circumstances Coorg was merged with the then Mysore in 1956.

State Minister (Mysore)
After the formation of the new Mysore State Poonacha was Minister for Home and Industries under its Chief Minister S. Nijalingappa. He was also chairman, State Trading Corporation of India from 1959 to 1963. He led the Government of India Trade delegation to some East European countries in 1960 and was the leader of the State Trading Corporation delegation to Japan in 1961.

Central Minister
Poonacha was elected to the Rajya Sabha in April 1964. Later Poonacha was made Union Minister without portfolio in Pandit Jawaharlal Nehru's cabinet. From 1 to 24 January 1966, he was Minister of State in the Ministry of Finance and from 25 January 1966 to 12 March 1967 Minister of State in the Ministry of Transport, Aviation, Shipping and Tourism. He contested and won the Lok Sabha seat for the Mangalore constituency in 1969. He contested again in 1971 as a candidate of NCO party, but lost.

Union Railway Minister
After some time he became Union Minister for Railways from 1967 to 1969 (at first interim and then final) and Minister for Steel and Heavy Engineering in 1969. At that time he was the Member of Parliament representing Mangalore Lok Sabha constituency to which Coorg then belonged.

Retirement

Governor
After his retirement from active politics, he served two terms as governor, once as Governor of Madhya Pradesh taking charge on 17 August 1978 and later as Governor of Orissa on 30 April 1980.

Family
Poonacha has two sons and two daughters. Two of his children, C. P. Belliappa and Kavery Nambisan, are well-known writers in English.

See also
List of Governors of Odisha
Governors of Madhya Pradesh
Kuttur Mallappa

References

Biodata of Cheppudi Muthana Poonacha (see page 6)

External links
http://www.irfca.org/docs/railway-ministers.html
https://web.archive.org/web/20090410070313/http://orissagov.nic.in/e-magazine/orissaannualreference/ORA-2005/pdf/bio-data_of_governor.pdf

1910 births
1990 deaths
Indian independence activists from Karnataka
Kodava people
Railway Ministers of India
People from Kodagu district
India MPs 1967–1970
Chief ministers of Indian states
Governors of Odisha
Members of the Constituent Assembly of India
Lok Sabha members from Karnataka
Chief ministers from Indian National Congress
Indian National Congress politicians from Karnataka
Coorg State MLAs 1952–1956
Rajya Sabha members from Karnataka
Indian National Congress (Organisation) politicians
Mysore MLAs 1957–1962
Governors of Madhya Pradesh
Indian National Congress politicians